The Great Lover is a 1931 American pre-Code film starring Adolphe Menjou and Irene Dunne, and directed by Harry Beaumont.  The supporting cast includes Ernest Torrence and Baclanova.

Plot summary
Jean Paurel is a famous opera star, who agrees to help Diana Page her career, in order to take advantage of her. But instead he finds himself falling in love with her.

Cast
 Adolphe Menjou as Jean Paurel
 Irene Dunne as Diana Page
 Ernest Torrence as Potter
 Neil Hamilton as Carlo
 Baclanova as Savarova 
 Cliff Edwards as Finney 
 Hale Hamilton as Stapleton 
 Roscoe Ates as Rosco
 Herman Bing as Losseck 
 Elsa Janssen as Madam Neumann Baumbach

Production
The earlier version, also based on the 1915 play, was The Great Lover (1920), starring John Sainpolis and Claire Adams.

The 1949 film The Great Lover starring Bob Hope was similar in title only.

References

External links
 
 
 
 

1931 films
Films directed by Harry Beaumont
Metro-Goldwyn-Mayer films
1931 romantic drama films
American romantic drama films
1930s American films